Garry John Hoolickin (born 29 October 1957) is an English footballer who played in the Football League for Oldham Athletic.

External links
Garry Hoolickin stats at Neil Brown stat site

English footballers
English Football League players
Oldham Athletic A.F.C. players
1957 births
Living people
People from Middleton, Greater Manchester
Association football defenders